In enzymology, a (R)-2-hydroxy-fatty-acid dehydrogenase is an enzyme that catalyzes the chemical reaction

(R)-2-hydroxystearate + NAD  2-oxostearate + NADH + H

Thus, the two substrates of this enzyme are (R)-2-hydroxystearate and NAD, whereas its 3 products are 2-oxostearate, NADH, and H. This reaction is important in fatty acid metabolism.

This enzyme belongs to the family of oxidoreductases, specifically those acting on the CH-OH group of donor with NAD or NADP as acceptor. The systematic name of this enzyme class is (R)-2-hydroxystearate:NAD oxidoreductase. Other names in common use include D-2-hydroxy fatty acid dehydrogenase, and 2-hydroxy fatty acid oxidase.

References 

 

EC 1.1.1
NADH-dependent enzymes
Enzymes of unknown structure